Mike Frantz (born 14 October 1986) is a German professional footballer who plays as a midfielder for 1. FC Saarbrücken in the 3. Liga.

Career
In July 2008, Frantz moved from 1. FC Saarbrücken to 1. FC Nürnberg.

On 13 June 2014, he joined SC Freiburg.

On 22 July 2020, Frantz joined Hannover 96 on a two-year contract.

Ahead of the 2022–23 season, Frantz returned to 1. FC Saarbrücken, signing a one-year contract.

References

External links
  
 

1986 births
Living people
German footballers
Association football midfielders
Borussia Neunkirchen players
1. FC Saarbrücken players
1. FC Nürnberg players
1. FC Nürnberg II players
SC Freiburg players
Hannover 96 players
Bundesliga players
2. Bundesliga players
3. Liga players
Sportspeople from Saarbrücken